The 2010 Price Chopper 400 was a NASCAR Sprint Cup Series stock car race that was held on October 3, 2010 at Kansas Speedway in Kansas City, Kansas. The 300 lap race was the twenty-ninth in the 2010 NASCAR Sprint Cup Series. The race was also the third event in the ten round Chase for the Sprint Cup competition, which would conclude the 2010 season. Greg Biffle, of the Roush Fenway Racing team, won the race, with Jimmie Johnson finishing second and Kevin Harvick third.

Pole position driver Kasey Kahne maintained his lead on the first lap to begin the race, as Jeff Gordon, who started in the third position on the grid, remained behind him. Twenty-three laps later Jeff Gordon became the leader of the race. After the final pit stops, Paul Menard became the leader of the race, but with less than fifty laps remaining, Biffle passed him. He maintained the first position to lead a total of sixty laps, and to win his second race of the season.

There were five cautions and twenty lead changes among twelve different drivers throughout the course of the race. It was Greg Biffle's second win in the 2010 season, and the sixteenth of his career. The result moved Biffle up to eighth in the Drivers' Championship, eighty-five points behind Jimmie Johnson and sixteen ahead of Jeff Burton. Chevrolet maintained its lead in the Manufacturers' Championship, thirty-seven ahead of Toyota and seventy-seven ahead of Ford, with seven races remaining in the season. A total of 100,000 people attended the race, while 5.25 million watched it on television.

Report

Background 

Kansas Speedway is one of ten intermediate to hold NASCAR races. The track's turns are banked at fifteen degrees, while the front stretch, the location of the finish line, is 10.4 degrees. The back stretch, opposite of the front, is at only five degrees. The racetrack has seats for 82,000 spectators.

Before the race, Denny Hamlin led the Drivers' Championship with 5,368 points, and Jimmie Johnson stood in second with 5,333. Kyle Busch was third in the Drivers' Championship with 5,323 points, fourteen ahead of Kurt Busch and twenty ahead of Kevin Harvick in fourth and fifth. Carl Edwards with 5,295 was seven ahead of Jeff Burton, as Jeff Gordon with 5,285 points, was fifty-seven ahead of Greg Biffle, and seventy-nine in front of Tony Stewart. Matt Kenseth and Clint Bowyer was eleventh and twelfth with 5,203 and 5,130 points. In the Manufacturers' Championship, Chevrolet was leading with 206 points, thirty-five ahead of Toyota. Ford, with 126 points, was thirteen points ahead of Dodge in the battle for third. Tony Stewart was the race's defending champion.

Practice and qualifying 
Three practice sessions were held before the Sunday race, one on Friday, and two on Saturday. The first session lasted 90 minutes, the second session lasted 45 minutes, and the final session lasted 60 minutes. During the first practice session, Juan Pablo Montoya, for the Earnhardt Ganassi Racing team, was quickest ahead of Ryan Newman in second and Jimmie Johnson in the third position. Paul Menard was scored fourth, and Jamie McMurray managed fifth. Carl Edwards, Clint Bowyer, Joey Logano, Denny Hamlin, and David Reutimann rounded out the top ten quickest drivers in the session.

During qualifying, forty-six cars were entered, but only forty-three were able because of NASCAR's qualifying procedure. Kasey Kahne clinched his eighteenth pole position in the Sprint Cup Series, with a time of 30.920. He was joined on the front row of the grid by Menard. Jeff Gordon qualified third, Joey Logano took fourth, and Greg Biffle started fifth. Kevin Harvick, one of the drivers in the Chase for the Sprint Cup, qualified twenty-fourth, while Carl Edwards was scored thirty-first. The three drivers that failed to qualify for the race were Jason Leffler, Mike Bliss, and Joe Nemechek. Once qualifying concluded, Kahne stated, "Coming to the green I felt great. I got through one and two really good and just got a little bit free into three so I missed the entrance a touch and then was able to gather it back and get rolling. I gave up a little bit of time there." He also added, "I noticed Paul Menard gained a lot right there in three going out late. He actually came really close to clipping us off. It was good. I’m glad we got the pole for Budweiser and Ford. It’ll be exciting, a couple of RPM guys on the front row on Sunday. That’s pretty exciting for the whole company. They did a real nice job."

On the next morning, Kurt Busch was quickest in the second practice session, ahead of Gordon and Matt Kenseth in second and third. Reutimann was fourth quickest, and Greg Biffle took fifth. Johnson, Dale Earnhardt Jr., Kahne, David Ragan, and Edwards followed in the top-ten. Other drivers in the chase, such as Kyle Busch, was twenty-first, and Kevin Harvick, who was twenty-second. Also in the second practice session, Biffle, who was scored fifth, spun sideways coming to the finish line, but received minor damage. During the third, and final practice session, Mark Martin, with a fastest time of 31.574, was quickest. Jimmie Johnson and Greg Biffle followed in second and third with times of 31.596 and 31.609 seconds. Logano managed to be fourth fastest, ahead of Jeff Gordon and Paul Menard. Edwards was scored seventh, McMurray took eighth, Bowyer was ninth, and Ragan took tenth. In this practice, both Martin and Johnson spun sideways at different times. Neither, Martin or Johnson sustained major damages to their race cars during the accidents.

Race 
The race, the twenty-ninth out of a total of thirty-six in the season, began at 1:00 p.m. EDT and was televised live in the United States on ESPN. Steve Schulze, pastor of Parsons Foursquare Church, began pre-race ceremonies, by giving the invocation. Next, Betti O., an Army veteran from Manhattan, Kansas, performed the national anthem, and Kelli Fuller, a Price Chopper contest winner, gave the command for drivers to start their engines. On the pace laps, three drivers had to move the rear of the grid; they were Mark Martin, Marcos Ambrose, both because of an engine change, and Casey Mears because of a transmission change.

Kasey Kahne retained his pole position lead into the first corner, followed by Paul Menard in the second position. On the same lap, Jeff Gordon passed Menard to claim second. Greg Biffle, who had started fifth, fell three position to eighth by lap two. Afterward, Biffle had fallen to ninth, and he started complaining about his car handling. By the ninth lap, Kahne had a 1.2 second lead over Gordon. Menard challenged Gordon for the second position on lap twelve. Matt Kenseth passed Joey Logano for fifth, while Biffle moved three positions to sixth. Kahne's lead grew more by lap 17, but less than two laps later, Gordon began to catch him. On lap 24, Kevin Conway was put a lap behind, after being passed by Kahne. Four laps later, Gordon became the new leader, after Kahne led twenty-seven laps.

On lap 29, Gordon was the leader, ahead of Kahne in second, Ryan Newman in third, Matt Kenseth was fourth, and Biffle in fifth. During the laps, 30 through 34, several drivers were put a lap down, which included, Tony Raines, Bobby Labonte, and Travis Kvapil. Afterward, Landon Cassill drove his car to the garage, as Gordon passed J. J. Yeley to put him a lap behind. had a lead of 3.4 secs when a caution was shown because Juan Pablo Montoya collided into the SAFER barrier. The drivers on the same lap as the leader made a pit stop during the caution, but Michael McDowell stayed on the race track to lead one lap before giving the lead back to Jeff Gordon.

On lap 49, Kurt Busch passed Kahne for the third position. Three laps later, the second caution was given because Kyle Busch crashed into David Reutimann, causing him to spin into the SAFER barrier. Most drivers stayed on the race track, but some exceptions were Jamie McMurray, Jimmie Johnson, and Clint Bowyer. One lap after the restart, Kenseth became the leader, after passing Gordon. After the collision, Reutimann was several laps behind the leader. After restarting second, Newman had fallen to sixth, while Tony Stewart moved into third. Seven laps later, Stewart claimed second from Gordon. Gordon was passed by Biffle on lap 72, as Stewart was catching Kenseth. Newman fell to eighth on lap 77, after Kyle Busch and Kevin Harvick passed him.

Two laps later, Harvick claimed the sixth position from Kyle Busch. Afterwards, Stewart became the leader, passing Kenseth on lap 81. By lap 86, Stewart had a 1.4 second lead over Kenseth. Less than five laps later, Biffle passed Kenseth for the second position. On lap 93, green flag pit stops began. Stewart, followed by Biffle came to pit road, giving the lead back to Matt Kenseth two laps later. When Kenseth made his pit stop, he gave the lead to Jeff Gordon. Allmendinger became the leader, after Gordon, Jeff Burton, Johnson, Mark Martin, and Kurt Busch made pit stops. Once most of the drivers completed their pit stops, Patrick Carpentier was the leader. On lap 99, Sam Hornish Jr. drove to the garage because of drive shaft problems. Four laps later, Travis Kvapil, who was running third, made his pit stop. Kvapil was followed by the second running car, David Gilliland. On lap 108, Carpentier drove to pit road for his pit stop, giving the lead to Stewart.

Five laps later, Johnson passed Kahne for the twelfth position. By the 123rd lap, Stewart had a 2.2 second lead over Biffle. Brad Keselowski and Elliott Sadler became a lap behind the leader, after Stewart passed them on lap 135. Nine laps later, green flag pit stops began. Afterward, Stewart gave the lead to Harvick, when he made a pit stop. Once Harvick came to pit road, Burton became the leader. On lap 149, Stewart reclaimed the lead. Three laps later, Reutimann collided with Kyle Busch, prompting the third caution on the race to be given. Most drivers made pit stops during the caution, but Harvick was an exception. Harvick led on the restart, as Stewart moved into second. On lap 163, Biffle passed Mark Martin for fourth, as Newman fell to sixth.

One lap later, Kahne collided into the SAFER barrier to cause the fourth caution. Most drivers after the ninth position made pit stops during the caution. Harvick led during the restart, but Stewart managed to pass Harvick to lead the next lap. Afterward, Harivck fell to third, as Biffle passed him. On lap 175, Burton moved to fifth, while Stewart had a 1.2 second lead over second. Then on lap 186, the fifth caution was given because Conway's engine failed. On the restart, McMurray was the leader, but he fell to second one lap later, after Menard passed him. On lap 202, Harvick passed McMurray for the fifth position. Five laps later, Biffle passed Menard to become the leader.

Afterward, Johnson moved to seventh, after passing Newman and McMurray. Gordon passed McMurray three laps later. By lap 220, Biffle had a 2.1 second lead over Menard, as Harvick passed Edwards for fourth. With 39 laps remaining, Biffle expanded his lead to 3.2 seconds. Four laps later, Johnson moved to sixth, after passing Edwards. On lap 135, the final green flag pit stops began. Once they began, Edwards became the leader, but one lap later, Biffle reclaimed the lead. After the pit stops concluded, Biffle was first, ahead of Stewart, Kenseth, Johnson, and Harvick in the top-five positions. By lap 244, Biffle had a 5.1 second lead over Stewart. One lap later, Johnson passed Kenseth for the third position. With less than ten laps remaining Stewart fell to fourth, after Johnson and Harvick passed him. Greg Biffle maintained the lead to win his second race of the 2010 season. Jimmie Johnson finished second, ahead of Harvick in third and Stewart in fourth. Gordon clinched the fifth position, after starting third.

Post-race 

Greg Biffle appeared in victory lane after his victory lap to start celebrating his second win of the season, in front of a crowd of 100,000 people. Afterward, he said, "We were kind of down in the dumps about Dover, one of our best race tracks, and we got trapped [when forced to pit off-sequence] – we had a top-10 car there. But we can't go back and do it over again. We'll keep doing the best we can. Everybody asks if we're out of it, and I said, 'We're going to do the best we can. If we win 'em all, we win 'em all."

"We had to change a lot of the race car around to get it right for today. It leads to a sleepless night and a frustrating morning, having anxious moments before the race, said second place finisher, Jimmie Johnson. Then, Denny Hamlin, who finished twelfth, stated, "It's not the kind of run we wanted, but we're not out of this by any means. The good part is we didn't panic."

Following the race, Johnson became the Drivers' Championship point standings leader with 5,503. Hamlin stood in second, eight points behind Johnson, and twenty-two ahead of Kevin Harvick. Carl Edwards, after finishing sixth in the race, remained in the fourth position with 5,450 points. Jeff Gordon was fifth, as Kurt Busch, Kyle Busch, Biffle, Jeff Burton, and Tony Stewart followed in the top-ten positions. The final two positions available in the Chase for the Sprint Cup was occupied with Matt Kenseth in eleventh and Clint Bowyer in twelfth. In the Manufacturers' Championship, Chevrolet maintained their lead with 212 points. Toyota remained second with 175 points. Ford followed with 135 points, nineteen points ahead of Dodge in fourth. 5.25 million people watched the race on television. The race took two hours, fifty-four minutes and two seconds to complete, and the margin of victory was 7.638 seconds.

Results

Qualifying

Race results

Standings after the race 

Drivers' Championship standings

Manufacturers' Championship standings

Note: Only the top twelve positions are included for the driver standings. These drivers qualified for the Chase for the Sprint Cup.

References 

Price Chopper 400
Price Chopper 400
NASCAR races at Kansas Speedway